Diuris flavescens, commonly called the pale yellow doubletail or Wingham doubletail, is a species of orchid which is endemic to a small area in New South Wales. It has two linear leaves at its base and up to five pale yellow flowers with dark brown markings. Fewer than 200 plants survive in grassy forest near Wingham.

Description
It is yellow with greenish brown and reddish brown blotches. Flowering occurs in September and October.

Taxonomy and naming
Diuris flavescens was first formally described in 1991 by David Jones from a specimen collected south-east of Wingham and the description was published in Australian Orchid Research. The specific epithet (flavescens) is a Latin word meaning "pale yellow", referring to the colour of the flowers of this species.

Distribution and habitat
The pale yellow doubletail grows in grassy forest in the Wingham district.

Conservation
Diuris flavescens is classified as "critically endangered" under the Australian government Environment Protection and Biodiversity Conservation Act 1999 and the New South Wales Biodiversity Conservation Act 2016. The main threats to the species are illegal collecting, weed invasion and habitat disturbance. The staff at the Australian Botanic Garden Mount Annan are working to secure the future of the species by growing it from collected seed with the fungus required by the orchid.

References

flavescens
Endemic orchids of Australia
Orchids of New South Wales
Plants described in 1991